William Savage Newton (1878 – 6 January 1915) was a British sports shooter. He competed in the 50 yard free pistol event at the 1908 Summer Olympics. 

Born in Montreal, Canada, of parents who later settled in England at Surbiton, Surrey, he was an engineer in civilian life and also served as a Captain in the Honourable Artillery Company. He was a Freemason, initiated into FitzRoy Lodge No 569 E.C. in London in 1913.

He was killed in action in Belgium during World War I, recordedly aged 36. He was buried in Kemmel Chateau Military Cemetery.

References

External links
 

1878 births
1915 deaths
British male sport shooters
Olympic shooters of Great Britain
Shooters at the 1908 Summer Olympics
Sportspeople from Montreal
British military personnel killed in World War I
British Army personnel of World War I
Honourable Artillery Company officers
British Freemasons